Saint Rudolph may refer to: 

 Rodulf (archbishop of Bourges) († 866)
 St. Rudolph, a fictional Japanese school from The Prince of Tennis, see List of The Prince of Tennis characters#St. Rudolph